Try Honesty is an EP released by Canadian rock band Billy Talent in 2001. It was recorded and mixed by Justin Koop and Billy Talent at The Music Gym in Burlington, Ontario. The first version of the EP features black-and-white lettering on an all-green background. The re-released version has black and white lettering with a picture of the band on a red background. This EP is very rare and sells for hundreds of dollars on eBay. This recording eventually gave them their credibility, allowing them to be noticed by producer Gavin Brown, in which he soon helped them finally sign them to a major label, and to explode onto the mainstream.

A music video was produced for the song which has the group performing in what appears to be an abandoned facility. It saw moderate airplay on Fuse in late 2003.

Track listing

Personnel 
Ben Kowalewicz – lead vocals
Ian D'Sa – guitar
Jon Gallant – bass
Aaron Solowoniuk – drums

2001 EPs
Billy Talent albums